Emanuel Ortega is an Argentine pop singer.  The son of Argentinian pop singer Ramón "Palito" Ortega.

Emanuel was introduced to music at a very early stage of life. Thanks to his father Ramón Ortega who was a Latin pop star. When Emanuel was only 6 years old, his family moved to the United States and settled down in Miami. Emanuel's artistic talents came out in 1989 while recording the song Para Siempre Amigos. After two years, Emanuel decided to go back to Argentina. He went there and formed a band called Ladrones De Ladrones.

In 1993 his first album was released under the title Conociendonos. It was an instant success. Soon it achieved gold status and later reached platinum in Argentina. In 1995 he went back to US and worked with renowned producer Carlos Alvarez.

Discography
 1994 - Conociéndonos
 1995 - Soñé
 1997 - Emanuel Ortega
 1999 - A escondidas
 2001 - Presente imperfecto
 2003 - Ortega
 2007 - El camino
 2009 - Todo bien
 2012 - Esta noche
 2014 - Momentos 1993-2014

References

Argentine pop singers
Emanuel
Living people
People from Buenos Aires
1977 births
21st-century Argentine singers